The Wittman V-Witt also called Witts V and Witt's Vee is single-engine tube-and-fabric construction aircraft specifically made for Formula V Air Racing.

Design
The aircraft is made of welded steel tube fuselage with fabric covering. The thin-profile wings are wire-supported. The engine requires a 12-inch extension to mount the propeller ahead of a streamlined cowling.

Operational history
The Witts V was flown in races and demonstrations from 1972 through 1981.

The prototype aircraft is on display at the EAA Airventure Museum in Oshkosh, Wisconsin.

Specifications (Wittman V-Witt)

See also

References

Notes

Homebuilt aircraft
V-Witt
Aircraft first flown in 1970
Single-engined tractor aircraft
United States sport aircraft
Racing aircraft